Jimmy Young Kim (born 1967) is an American taekwondo practitioner and instructor who won a gold medal in the heavyweight division at the 1988 Summer Olympics in Seoul, South Korea.

He earned a bachelor's degree in biology with an emphasis on Human Physiology from UC Berkeley.

After graduating from UC Berkeley,  he earned a Doctor of Chiropractic Degree from the Los Angeles College of Chiropractic, now known as the Southern California University of Health Sciences.

Current & Former Students
 Charlotte Craig, U.S. Olympian, Beijing 2008
 Gina-Louise Williams, U.S. Collegiate National Team, Korea
 Kira Cramer, U.S. Collegiate National Team, Madrid, Spain
 Troy Lunn, U.S. Junior National Team
 Muhammad Chishti, U.S. Poomsae National Team, WTF Poomsae World Championships, Ankara, Turkey
 Lilian Angel, Poomsae National Team, WTF Poomsae World Championships, Ankara, Turkey
 Skylar Farrell, 2016, 2017, 2018 AAU National Team, 2019 USAT All American
 Noah Kim, 2018 AAU Junior National Team, 2018 USAT All-American, 2019 USAT All American
 Nicholas Kim, 2019 AAU Cadet National Team
 Siena Nguyen, 2019 AAU Cadet National Team
 Ocean Farrell, 2016 AAU Mini Cadet National B-Team

References

External links
 1988 Gold Medal Match (video)
 
 https://www.olympic.org/jimmy-kim
 http://articles.latimes.com/1988-08-12/sports/sp-327_1_martial-art
 http://www.taekwondodata.com/jimmy-kim.a2pm.html
 https://patch.com/california/cerritos/jimmy-kim-grand-master-chan-yong-oriental-moo-do-taekf81f6d0595

1967 births
Living people
American male taekwondo practitioners
Medalists at the 1988 Summer Olympics
Taekwondo practitioners at the 1988 Summer Olympics
Date of birth missing (living people)
Olympic gold medalists for the United States in taekwondo
Pan American Games medalists in taekwondo
Pan American Games gold medalists for the United States
Taekwondo practitioners at the 1987 Pan American Games
World Taekwondo Championships medalists
Medalists at the 1987 Pan American Games
21st-century American people